There have been twelve referendums in Lithuania since it declared independence from the Soviet Union on March 11, 1990. Because of strict requirements only four referendums were successful. Older Lithuanian laws required that more than a half of all registered voters (not a half of voters who participate) would vote in support of a proposal for it to become a binding obligation to the government. In 2002, this requirement was lowered to one third of all registered voters.

The procedure to call for a referendums is also challenging. The initiators need to present 300,000 signatures of registered voters in three months or the Seimas, the Parliament of Lithuania, has to approve it by a fourth of all the members of the Seimas. Despite the difficulties, the idea to call referendums is very popular among the politicians.

2002 law changes
In anticipation of referendum regarding the membership in the European Union, the Law on Referendum was passed on June 4, 2002.

The law prescribes that the voting is conducted based on democratic principles: universal, direct, and equal suffrage and secret ballot. There are two types of referendums: mandatory and consultative (deliberative). Mandatory referendums must be held to:
 amend Chapters 1 (The State of Lithuania) and 14 (Amending the Constitution) of the Constitution of Lithuania
 amend the June 8, 1992 Constitutional Act, "On Non-Alignment of the Republic of Lithuania to Post-Soviet Eastern Alliances" 
 approve participation in international organizations if membership requires partial transfer of the scope of competence of Government bodies to the institutions of international organizations or the jurisdiction
 other mandatory or consultative referendums might be held if enough registered voters express support by signing the petition which specify what type of referendums it should be.

The law lowered the requirements for number of votes needed to approve the resolution. For consultative referendums, a half of all registered voters need to participate and a half of those participating need to vote in favor. Seimas then have a month to decide on the resolution. For mandatory referendums, instead of a half of all registered voters it now demands one third. In addition, more than a half of all voters need to participate and of those participating a half needs to vote in favor. There are exceptions to this rule:

 To change the first sentence ("The State of Lithuania shall be an independent, democratic Republic") of the Constitution and to amend the Constitutional Act of June 8, 1992 it requires approval of at least three-fourths of all citizens registered to vote.
 To amend Chapters 1 through 14 of the Constitution it requires approval of more than half of all registered voters.
 The decision on the participation in international organizations will be adopted if it has been approved by more than one half of the voters who have participated in the referendum. This exception was adopted on February 25, 2003, just 2.5 months before the referendum on the European Union.

The law also lowered the number of Seimas votes needed to announce a referendum from one third to one fourth. However, the requirements for citizen initiated referendum are the same: they need to collect 300,000 signatures of registered voters in three months.

Referendum results
The successful referendums are marked in light green, while failed ones are in pink. The color denotes which number was used to determine the outcome. Two referendums failed on two counts: they not only did not receive support from more than 50% of all registered voters, but also less than 50% of the voters came to vote. They are deemed not to have taken place.

Notes

References
  Nuo 1991 m. iki šiol paskelbtų referendumų rezultatai (Results from Refrenda 1991-Present), Microsoft Word Document, Seimas. Accessed June 17, 2006. 
 Law on Referendum, Seimas, June 4, 2002. No. IX – 929 (as last amended on 17 November 2005 — No X-398). Accessed June 17, 2006.
  Law on Amendment of Chapters 7, 11, 13, 35, 43, 50, 51, 54, 78 and on Adding Chapter 78(1) to Law on Referendum, Seimas, February 25, 2003, No. IX-1349. Accessed June 17, 2006.
  Audrius Bačiulis, Referendumas - būdas siekti populiarumo (Referendum - a way to seek popularity), Veidas, July 18, 2002, No. 29. Accessed June 17, 2006.